Marun Seh (also Romanized as Mārūn Seh; also known as  Shāveh-ye Mārūn-e Seh) is a village in Moshrageh Rural District, Moshrageh District, Ramshir County, Khuzestan Province, Iran. At the 2006 census, its population was 69, in 13 families.

References 

Populated places in Ramshir County